WFBD (channel 48) is a religious television station licensed to Destin, Florida, United States, serving the Pensacola area as an owned-and-operated station of Tri-State Christian Television (TCT). The station's transmitter is located near Wing, Alabama, north of the Alabama–Florida state line.

Due to its transmitter location, WFBD's signal covers the eastern half of the Pensacola–Mobile area and not Mobile proper. Therefore, in order to serve the western part of the market, the station is simulcast in high definition on the second digital subchannel of Fort Walton Beach–licensed WPAN (channel 53.2) from its transmitter near Molino, Florida.

History
The channel 48 frequency was previously used by former TV station WKAB-TV (1952–1954).

WFBD was formerly an affiliate of the America One television network, and a subscriber to the Independent News Network. It later switched to a format of local programming and infomercials.

On May 28, 2020, Flinn Broadcasting Corporation announced that it would sell WFBD, along with sister stations KCWV in Duluth, Minnesota, WBIH in Selma, Alabama, and WWJX in Jackson, Mississippi, to Marion, Illinois-based Tri-State Christian Television for an undisclosed price. The sale was completed on September 15; the stations became owned-and-operated stations of the TCT network two days later, with WFBD becoming the fourth full-power religious station in the Pensacola–Mobile area.

Subchannels
The station's digital signal is multiplexed:

References

External links

Tri-State Christian Television affiliates
Twist (TV network) affiliates
Defy TV affiliates
TrueReal affiliates
Scripps News affiliates
FBD
Television channels and stations established in 2005
2005 establishments in Florida